The Iernut Power Station is a large thermal power plant located in Iernut, Mureș County having 6 generation groups, 4 of 100 MW and 2 groups of 200 MW having a total electricity generation capacity of 800 MW.

In 2007, a contract was signed with Austrian company Verbund for the installation of a seventh electricity generation group of 400 MW at a total cost of US$375 million that will increase the installed capacity of the power plant to 1,200 MW.

In 2012 the power station was acquired by Romgaz in quantum of the accumulated debt of 150 million euro by the previous owner company, Electrocentrale București.

References

Natural gas-fired power stations in Romania